Ləpəxeyranlı (also, Ləpəhəyranlı, Lepekheyranly, and Lopa-Kheyranly) is a village in the Qubadli Rayon of Azerbaijan.

Ləpəxeyranlı is Azeri village in Qubadli

References 

Populated places in Qubadli District